Cleophus Emmanuel Cooksey Jr. (born March 25, 1982) is an accused American serial killer from Phoenix, Maricopa County, Arizona. He has been charged with nine murders and other crimes committed in the city and in surrounding areas during a 21-day span between November and December 2017.  All nine victims had been shot.  His mother, Rene Cooksey, and his stepfather, Edward Nunn, were the final two victims. A blood-covered Cooksey was arrested at the scene.

Ballistics evidence, DNA testing, stolen jewelry and a stolen mobile phone belonging to one of the victims linked Cooksey to the other seven murders.  Phoenix authorities say there is a "distinct possibility" of more victims.  Investigations into unsolved murders are ongoing.

Cooksey, a grandson of Tucson civil rights leader Roy L. Cooksey, is currently represented by public defender Gary Beren.

Known victims

Previous convictions
Cleophus Cooksey Jr. had been convicted of manslaughter and armed robbery in 2001 and had been released the previous July.  He was one of four men who attempted to rob a topless bar. Although the manager fatally shot one of Cooksey's accomplices and the shooting was deemed self-defense, under Arizona's felony murder law, Cooksey was held culpable because the death occurred during the commission of a crime.  Under an agreement, he pleaded guilty to manslaughter.

Related arrests
Phoenix police arrested three women: Desaree Coronado (aged 23) and sisters Griselda and Liliana Vasquez (ages 24 and 26, respectively), on one count each of hindering prosecution and tampering with physical evidence.  Both are felonies.  Coronado was the mother of Jesus Real's child.  She was also charged with one misdemeanor count of false reporting to law enforcement.  Liliana Vasquez is Cleophus Cooksey Jr.'s ex-girlfriend.  Griselda Vasquez ultimately admitted to taking a mobile phone off Real's body.  Police say they have evidence that Liliana's car was in the area of two of the murders.

Their bonds were set at $3,000.

References

External links
 YouTube video of Phoenix police department announcing Cleophus Cooksey Jr.'s arrest (January 18, 2018)

1982 births
Living people
American spree killers
American people convicted of manslaughter
American people convicted of robbery
People charged with murder